Headbangers Ball is a music television program that consisted of heavy metal music videos airing on MTV and its global affiliates. The show began on MTV on April 18, 1987, playing heavy metal music videos from both well-known and more obscure artists. The show offered (and became famous because of) a stark contrast to Top 40 music videos shown during the day.

However, with the mainstream rise of alternative rock, grunge, pop punk and rap music in the 1990s, the relevance of Headbangers Ball came into question, and the show was ultimately canceled in 1995. Over eight years later, as new genres of heavy metal were gaining a commercial foothold and fan interest became unavoidable, the program was reintroduced on MTV2. It had remained in varying degrees on the network's website, but by the early 2020s, it was no longer shown on television. A similar show, titled The Ball and hosted by former Headbangers Ball host Riki Rachtman, debuted in March 2021.

Many of the videos that aired on the first incarnation of the series would find a home on the similarly themed Metal Mayhem on sister channel MTV Classic.

History

Hosts
"The Ball", as it is commonly called, replaced Heavy Metal Mania (which began airing monthly in June 1985), helmed by Dee Snider of Twisted Sister fame. In doing so, MTV expanded the format and added more live interviews with bands. At its premiere it was hosted briefly by Kevin Seal, then by VJ Adam Curry, before ultimately settling on Riki Rachtman, who to many viewers became the most identifiable host of the show.

Popularity and influence
The name "Headbangers Ball" was originally invented and used by DJ John Brent of Bury, Lancashire and was used on his rock and metal roadshows from 1980 onwards and toured throughout the UK with great success. John's Headbangers Ball Rock charts were also regularly featured in the pages of Rock publications Kerrang! and Sounds along with many features on the show in local periodicals.

Headbangers Ball was one of the most popular music shows ever to air on MTV, on the air for nearly 8 years, and for a time, it was one of the network's flagship shows. For some time in 1988 and 1989, the show was increased to 3 hours. One hour added, plus Hard 60, a daily version of the ball that aired for an hour every weekday afternoon.
	
Its influence was made widespread with the rise of heavy metal in the 1980s and early 1990s. While the program primarily showed videos from the mainstream friendly "hair metal" during the 1980s, it gave an equal amount of time to the often more aggressive-sounding heavy metal music scene active in the late 1980s and early 1990s. This level of popularity also resulted in North American tours presented by Headbangers Ball; one took place in 1987 and featured Helloween, Armored Saint and Grim Reaper, while the lineup of the 1989 tour consisted of Anthrax, Exodus and Helloween, and the 1992 version had Megadeth and Suicidal Tendencies. These events were likely the inspiration for the European MTV Headbangers Ball tours, which have taken place since the late 2010s. Heavier alternative acts, spearheaded by the likes of The Cult, Faith No More, Primus and Jane's Addiction, were finding increased residence on Headbangers Ball at the turn of the decade, but it was early into the 1990s that grunge and alternative rock bands like Nirvana, Pearl Jam, Soundgarden and Alice in Chains began to uproot the "hair metal" scene and led to its final decline. Bands such as Stone Temple Pilots, White Zombie, Tool and Blind Melon would follow suit, resulting in a major shift in identity for the show, where metal mainstays such as Metallica, Megadeth, Pantera, Testament, Suicidal Tendencies and Dream Theater shared airspace with the new crop of alternative hard rock acts. Several punk rock bands, including the Ramones, The Offspring, Rancid, Bad Religion and Sick of It All, also received airplay on the show, which, by 1995, would continue to focus on less mainstream forms of heavy metal.

Other notable TV programs have emulated Headbanger's Ball, such as Fuse TV's Uranium and VH1's Rock Show. The popularity and effectiveness of Uranium in the early 2000s may have been cited as a strong influence to the revival of The Ball in 2003.

Road trips
Bands would visit the set for interviews, and in some instances, the show would follow bands on trips to assorted locations across the world. Memorable road trip episodes include the Moscow Music Peace Festival with Ozzy Osbourne, Mötley Crüe, Bon Jovi, Skid Row, Cinderella and Gorky Park, Monsters of Rock in Donington, Alice in Chains' trip to Action Water Park, bowling with Soundgarden, skydiving with Megadeth, Oktoberfest in Munich with Danzig, and Van Halen's adventure at Cabo Wabo.

Death of The Ball
The show remained on the air until January 1995, when MTV abruptly canceled the show without any prior warning to viewers, host Riki Rachtman, or the production staff. The European version, hosted by Vanessa Warwick, was on the air until 1997, but limited to an hour and a half (as opposed to the three hours given in past years).

Rachtman was informed of the cancellation days afterward when, after filming what would end up being the final episode, he was simply informed via phone call that he would not have to show up to work the following week. No official reason was given for the show's cancellation, but it is suspected to be because MTV was then playing grunge and alternative more often during its main programming, although they did not play a lot of metal or interview the bands.

Many MTV fans were outraged at the show's abrupt cancellation, as well as denying Rachtman and the production staff the chance to inform viewers that the show was going off the air, or to allow them to put together a "farewell show" for the loyal viewers of Headbangers Ball. Some regular-citizen critics of MTV even cite the cancellation of Headbangers Ball as one of the key decisions which caused the network to "jump the shark". The demise of The Ball also came in at #4 on VH1's 40 Least Metal Moments in 2005. In mid-February The Ball would be replaced by the short-lived Superock, a show featuring videos and interviews with metal, alternative and rap artists.

Over the years, MTV Europe attempted to fill the void left by the cancellation of Headbangers Ball with other rock-themed block programs such as the Julia Valet-hosted Superock, but all have failed for various reasons – including MTV Europe's addition of pop, dance and alternative videos to some of the shows which made them not much different from the rest of the day.

Rebirth

After nearly a decade of the show being off the air, MTV2 started up the series again on Saturday, May 10, 2003 at 11 p.m. The revived Headbangers Ball initially had the same type of playlist as its latter "sister shows" in MTV Europe, as well as interviews with metal artists (current and classic). The debut episode was hosted by Metallica, a trend which continued with various artists. Later on, Hatebreed vocalist Jamey Jasta became a permanent host. However, the show still continued to have guest host artists at times. The show eventually returned to its roots (in types of music) of showing underground music, as well as metalcore, death metal and thrash.

During VH1's 40 Least Metal Moments countdown, musicians criticized the 2003 incarnation of Headbangers Ball in comparison with the original, citing its "scripted" studio feel and lack of excitement. The new version mostly shows only music videos and in-studio interviews, which was not true of the original show.

When asked in September 2015 about a possible return of Headbangers Ball, former host Riki Rachtman stated, "It's not gonna happen. I tried, I told them I would do it for free, they never even returned my calls."

Although the show has not been on the air for years, there have been European tours called "MTV Headbangers Ball" since 2016, with the exception of 2020 and 2021 due to the COVID-19 pandemic; this tour package traditionally takes place from late November to mid-December, and features four metal bands. The European "MTV Headbangers Ball" tour has included mostly thrash metal bands such as Exodus, Overkill, Death Angel, Sodom, Vio-lence, Artillery, Xentrix, Whiplash and Suicidal Angels ‒ as well as other acts like Max + Igor Cavalera, Iced Earth, Kataklysm, Insomnium, Ensiferum, Unearth, Deserted Fear, Whitechapel, Fleshgod Apocalypse and Dyscarnate ‒ as a headlining or opening act; the only band so far that has taken part of the tour more than once is Kataklysm. The concept of the MTV Headbangers Ball Tour in Europe was possibly inspired by the 1989 US tour with the same name that included Anthrax, Helloween and Exodus.

Removal of the show from Headbangers Ball
Since the January 13, 2007, episode, Headbangers Ball simply became the title for a block of metal videos, rather than an actual show. However, the June 23, 2007, episode went behind the scenes of the induction of Pantera guitarist "Dimebag" Darrell Abbott at the Hollywood's RockWalk, including segments covering the event in between music videos. Also, brief interview segments still frequently air before and after commercial breaks, typically re-airing on several consecutive episodes for a long period.

On April 14, 2007, MTV2 began to air the show from 11 p.m. to 1 a.m. and put Saturday Rock the Deuce, a hard rock–alternative show, at 10. The week's episode was also re-aired on Tuesday mornings from 4:00 to 6:00 a.m.

Starting in 2008, Headbangers Ball had been aired erratically, sometimes airing several hours later than its normal airtime or not being aired at all. Its last on-air time slot was Tuesdays 3AM-4AM.

On July 21, 2011, Jose Mangin took over as host of Headbangers Ball, which is now a web-only show.

The Ball
On March 17, 2021, it was announced that Rachtman would be hosting The Ball, airing on Gimme Metal TV and presented by Knotfest.com. The show finds Rachtman "reviving that classic heavy metal music video show feel in an episode that would feature videos from the likes of Megadeth, Metallica, Power Trip, and so much more." The first episode premiered on March 27, 2021.

Discography
Headbangers Ball labeled products, including a guitar tabs book and three CD sets including artists such as Hatebreed, Opeth, DevilDriver, God Forbid, Chimaira, Dirge Within, Sevendust, Lacuna Coil, Atreyu, Mushroomhead, Shadows Fall, Children of Bodom, Lamb of God, A Life Once Lost, Cradle of Filth, Deftones, and Godsmack have also been sold.

Each album has at least one live song. The first Headbangers Ball compilation featured "Raining Blood" by Slayer as its live track, the second compilation used an in-studio performance of "My Tortured Soul" by Probot, and the latest compilation had two live tracks: "A Bid Farewell" by Killswitch Engage and "Now You've Got Something To Die For" by Lamb of God. The earliest-released CD has famous bands, and the second has obscure ones. Songs featuring Slipknot band members Corey Taylor and Joey Jordison appeared on all three CDs through their other bands. Other bands that have appeared on all three compilations include Killswitch Engage, Lamb of God, and In Flames.
 MTV2 Headbangers Ball (2003)
 MTV2 Headbangers Ball Volume 2 (2004)
 MTV2 Headbangers Ball: The Revenge (2006)

References

External links 
 Official show sites
 United States 
 UK
 Denmark
 Finland
 Sweden
 Australia 
 Official site for albums spawned from Headbangers Ball 
 
 
 Jump The Shark - Headbangers Ball

MTV original programming
Heavy metal television series
1987 American television series debuts
1980s American music television series
1990s American music television series
2000s American music television series
1995 American television series endings
2003 American television series debuts
2007 American television series endings
English-language television shows
American television series revived after cancellation